William Millard may refer to:

William Millard (businessman) (born 1932), American businessman
William Millard (cricketer) (1856–1923), English cricketer
William Millard (politician) (1844–1921), Australian politician
William Millard (athlete) (c.1855–1939), Australian athlete, winner of the first Stawell Gift